The Global Industry Classification Standard (GICS) is an industry taxonomy developed in 1999 by MSCI and Standard & Poor's (S&P) for use by the global financial community. The GICS structure consists of 11 sectors, 24 industry groups, 69 industries and 158 sub-industries into which S&P has categorized all major public companies.  The system is similar to ICB (Industry Classification Benchmark), a classification structure maintained by FTSE Group.

GICS is used as a basis for S&P and MSCI financial market indexes in which each company is assigned to a sub-industry, and to an industry, industry group, and sector, by its principal business activity. "GICS" is a registered trademark of McGraw Hill Financial and MSCI Inc.

Classification
The classification is as follows:

Revisions
The classification standard is regularly updated by S&P Dow Jones Indices and MSCI. Numerous changes over the years have resulted in the addition, deletion, or redefinition of various sub-industries, industries, or industry groups. Since 1999, there have been two revisions at the sector level:

In 2016, the real estate industry group (with the exception of mortgage REITs) was moved out of the financials sector to a newly created real estate sector.
In 2018, the telecommunication services sector was renamed communication services. The sector was expanded to include media and entertainment companies previously in the consumer discretionary sector, as well as interactive media and services companies from the information technology sector.

See also

 Industry Classification Benchmark
 International Standard Industrial Classification
 North American Industry Classification System
 Standard Industrial Classification
 Thomson Reuters Business Classification

References

Industry classifications
Financial markets